We Are Never Alone is a 2016 Czech drama film directed by Petr Vaclav. It was selected to be screened in the Contemporary World Cinema section at the 2016 Toronto International Film Festival.

Cast
 Klaudia Dudová
 Zdeněk Godla
 Miroslav Hanuš
 Karel Roden
 Lenka Vlasáková

References

External links
 

2016 films
2016 drama films
Czech drama films
2010s Czech-language films
Golden Kingfisher winners
Czech Film Critics' Awards winners